Mauro Ravnić (born 29 November 1959) is a Croatian retired footballer who played as a goalkeeper.

He spent his 17-year professional career with Rijeka in his homeland, and Valladolid and Lleida in Spain. Subsequently, he worked as a goalkeeper coach and manager in the latter country.

Club career
Born in Rijeka, Socialist Federal Republic of Yugoslavia, Ravnić started playing with hometown's NK Rijeka, making his professional debuts at the age of 18 and eventually appearing in over 200 official games. He moved abroad in 1988, signing with La Liga club Real Valladolid at the same time as compatriot Janko Janković – his teammate at Rijeka – and was an essential unit in his first year, as the Castile and León team finished sixth and reached the final of the Copa del Rey.

In the following seasons, Ravnić alternated between the bench and the posts, notably competing with René Higuita in the 1991–92 campaign, which ended in relegation. Aged 32, he signed with UE Lleida in the second division, helping it return to the top level after a 43-year absence whilst winning the Ricardo Zamora Trophy (only 20 goals conceded in all 38 matches).

After the Catalans were immediately relegated back, Ravnić chose to retire, later working with Valladolid as a goalkeeper coach and returning to Lleida as a youth coordinator. His first head coaching experience would arrive in the following decade, with amateurs AE Prat and FC Benavent.

In 2010, Ravnić was appointed manager at newly formed FC Ascó, who competed in the Spanish fourth division.

International career
During roughly one year, Ravnić earned six caps for the Yugoslavian national team. His debut came on 29 October 1986, in a 4–0 win over Turkey for the UEFA Euro 1988 qualifiers.

Ravnić last appearance was on 11 November 1987, for the same competition: he allowed four goals before half-time against England, being replaced by Vladan Radača in an eventual 1–4 loss.

Career statistics

Club

International

Honours

Club
Rijeka
Yugoslav Cup: 1977–78, 1978–79
Balkans Cup: 1977–78

Valladolid
Copa del Rey: Runner-up 1988–89

Lleida
Segunda División: 1992–93

Individual
Ricardo Zamora Trophy (Segunda División): 1992–93

References

External links

National team data 

1959 births
Living people
Footballers from Rijeka
Yugoslav footballers
Croatian footballers
Association football goalkeepers
Yugoslav First League players
HNK Rijeka players
La Liga players
Segunda División players
Real Valladolid players
UE Lleida players
Yugoslavia international footballers
Croatian expatriate footballers
Expatriate footballers in Spain
Croatian expatriate sportspeople in Spain
Croatian football managers
AE Prat managers
Croatian expatriate football managers
Expatriate football managers in Spain